72 Heroes is a 2011 Chinese historical drama film directed by Hong Kong film director Derek Chiu, better known as Sung Kee Chiu, based on the story of the 72 Martyrs who sacrificed their lives in the Second Guangzhou Uprising.

Plot
The film takes place in Huizhou, Guangdong, China, October 1900. After failing to assassinate the governor-general by blowing up his mansion as part of the anti-Manchu Huizhou Uprising, revolutionary Shi Jianru is captured and executed. Guangzhou, Guangdong province, 1911: following other unsuccessful uprisings, Pan Dawei, deputy head of the Guangzhou department of the Tongmenghui, arrives by boat and smuggles weapons past customs officers. During a dinner party at the house of wealthy local trader Fang Hongzhi, head of the Guangxing business association, there is an assassination attempt on the Manchu Qing government's Marine Minister Li Zhun, which fails. Among the guests is Luo Zhonghuo, just arrived from Penang, Malaysia, who gets to know Fang's daughter, Huiru, also a revolutionary. Afterwards she takes him to the house of painter Gao Jianfu, head of the Tongmenghui's Guangzhou department. Zhonghuo is carrying a letter from Tongmenghui leader Sun Yat-sen, but neither Jianfu nor Dawei are sure whether he is a spy. To convince them he is genuine, Huiru suggests he tries raising some money for the movement from her father, by first becoming friendly with his cultured longtime mistress Jiang Meixi. Zhonghuo becomes Meixi's English tutor and helps Fang in getting a local gang off of the Guangxing's turf. As Chinese New Year arrives, Gao and Pan plan a mass suicide attack on the governor-general's residence - in what will become known as the Second Guangzhou Uprising of 27 April 1911.

Cast
Liu Kai-chi as Gao Jianfu
Tse Kwan-ho as Pan Dawei
Irene Wan as Jiang Meixi
Elanne Kong as Fang Huiru
Wang Jiancheng as Fang Hongzhi
Zhao Bingrui as Luo Zhonghan
Eric Tsang as Li Zhi
Alan Tam as Hunag Ying
Oh U Jeong as Fang's female bodyguard
Li Zhi
Zhang Yang
Wu Jian as A Hui
Bosco Wong
Raymond Lam

See also
 1911 (film)

External links

72 Heroes at Hong Kong Cinemagic

2011 films
2010s historical drama films
Works about the 1911 Revolution
Films set in 1900
Films set in 1911
Films set in Guangdong
Films shot in China
Chinese historical drama films
Films set in 20th-century Qing dynasty
2011 drama films
2010s Mandarin-language films